Khulna-1 is a constituency represented in the Jatiya Sangsad (National Parliament) of Bangladesh since 2008 by Panchanan Biswas of the Awami League.

Boundaries 
The constituency encompasses Batiaghata and Dacope upazilas.

History 
The constituency was created for the first general elections in newly independent Bangladesh, held in 1973.

Ahead of the 2008 general election, the Election Commission redrew constituency boundaries to reflect population changes revealed by the 2001 Bangladesh census. The 2008 redistricting altered the boundaries of the constituency.

Ahead of the 2014 general election, the Election Commission reduced the boundaries of the constituency. Previously it had also included one union parishad of Paikgachha Upazila: Deluti.

Members of Parliament

Elections

Elections in the 2010s

Elections in the 2000s

Elections in the 1990s 
Sheikh Hasina stood for three seats in the June 1996 general election: Bagerhat-1, Khulna-1, and Gopalganj-3. After winning all three, she chose to represent Gopalganj-3 and quit the other two, triggering by-elections in them. Panchanan Biswas was elected in a September 1996 by-election.

References

External links
 

Parliamentary constituencies in Bangladesh
Khulna District